Julio Leonardo Peralta Martínez (born 9 September 1981) is an inactive professional tennis player from Chile. Peralta has found success in the late stage of his career, reaching no. 29 in the ATP rankings in doubles. He captured six doubles titles at ATP World Tour and one singles challenger title. He went on hiatus from 2005 to 2007, from 2009 to 2011, from 2012 to 2014 and from 2018 to 2022.

Career

2000-2004
Peralta turned pro in 2000, and had his best year in his singles career in 2003, year which he won a challenger tournament, the BH Tennis Open International Cup in Belo Horizonte. He retired in 2005.

2007-2008
He made a comeback in 2007 at ITF Futures tournaments. Julio competed throughout 2008, but he suffered an injury the next year.

2011: Second Comeback
He made his comeback (after long, exhausting, two-year injury) in the 2011 Sparkassen Open, winning comfortably the first two qualifying rounds, against Stefan Seifert and David Goffin (no. 220). In the main tournament, he defeated Victor Crivoi.

2014: Third Comeback
After a long hiatus, he returned in September at the 2014 Napa Valley Challenger doubles tournament partnering Matt Seeberger as a wildcard pair.

In early November, he won the titles in both singles and doubles USA F30 tournament, not dropping a single set in the main draw in both tournaments. In Chile F9 tournament he made the singles final, losing to Hans Podlipnik-Castillo and the following week won the doubles tournament in Chile F10 partnering Seeberger.

2015: New partnership and Challenger Tour success
Peralta played many Challenger Tour tournaments during the year, reaching seven finals and winning four, partnering Horacio Zeballos in three of these titles. With the victories, Peralta rose almost 400 positions in the rankings, ending the year at No. 105.

2016: Three ATP Doubles titles 
He broke through onto the ATP World Tour doubles circuit in 2016, winning the Brazil Open, the Swiss Open and the Moselle Open with Horacio Zeballos. He won his first match in a Grand Slam at the French Open, partnering Denis Kudla, but the duo lost in the second round. Peralta also won six challenger tournaments, partnering Zeballos in four, in one with Dennis Novikov, and at Santiago with countryman Hans Podlipnik. Peralta tied with Matt Reid and John-Patrick Smith for most Challenger titles in doubles for the year. Peralta finished the year ranked No. 44 in the world in doubles, and the highest ranked Chilean player in singles or doubles, record he has held since then.

2017: Another title, French Open quarterfinals, top 30 debut
Peralta and Zeballos reached the final of the Ecuador Open, but lost to James Cerretani and Philipp Oswald. They went on to win the U.S. Men's Clay Court Championships. At the French Open, he partnered Zeballos to reach the quarterfinals. This saw his ranking jump to a career high of No. 35.

In the rest of the year, Peralta reached two more tournament finals with Zeballos, and another one with Santiago González, with whom he reached quarterfinals at the 2017 Shanghai Rolex Masters too.

Peralta ended the year at World No. 29, his best position yet.

2018: First ATP 500 & one more titles
Peralta had a slow beginning of the year, with semifinals at 2018 ASB Classic as the only notable result. Julio and Horacio Zeballos reunited for attempting a defense of their title in the U.S. Men's Clay Court Championships, but they lost in first round. They also tried to imitate their past year quarterfinals run on the French Open, but they lost in second round. Partnering with Roman Jebavy, they reached semifinals of the 2018 Antalya Open. 

Peralta and Zeballos partnered again for the 2018 Wimbledon and won over 16th seeds Max Mirnyi and Philipp Oswald in first round, but then lost in second round. The partnership went on and they won the 2018 Swedish Open, defeating in the final the Italian pair Simone Bolelli and Fabio Fognini. The following week Peralta and Zeballos won another title, the 2018 German Open, his first on the ATP 500 level, defeating Oliver Marach and Mate Pavić in the final.

2022: Back on the ATP tour
After almost 4 years of hiatus, Peralta came back on the ATP tour in April where he entered the 2022 BMW Open with Franko Škugor with a protected ranking and next at the Italian Open as an alternate pair also with Škugor where they won their first round match against top 50 players Tomislav Brkic and Nikola Cacic.

ATP career finals

Doubles: 10 (6 titles, 4 runner-ups)

ATP Challenger & ITF Futures finals

Singles (8–6)

Doubles (18–10)

Doubles performance timeline

References

External links 
 
 

Chilean male tennis players
Tennis players from Santiago
Living people
1981 births
Olympic tennis players of Chile
Tennis players at the 2016 Summer Olympics
21st-century Chilean people